Dollo may refer to:

People 
 Benny Dollo (born 1950), Indonesian football coach
 Louis Dollo (1857–1931), Belgian palaeontologist

Other uses 
 Dollo Zone, Ethiopia
 Dollo, a dialect of the Basketo language